Sattahip is a district (amphoe) in Chonburi province, Thailand. It is at the southern tip of the province southeast of Bangkok. In 2014, the district had a population of 157,000 in an area of 348,122 km2.

Geography

Neighboring districts are Bang Lamung to the north, and Ban Chang of Rayong province to the east. To the south and the west is the Gulf of Thailand.

Islands
Several islands are in Sattahip District, the largest of which is Ko Khram Yai. Many of the islands are in Sattahip Bay (อ่าวสัตหีบ).

History
The recorded history of Sattahip begins with a woman named Jang, who owned much land in Sattahip District. Admiral Prince Abhakara Kiartivongse, a son of King Rama V, was sent to create a naval base at Sattahip. He thought it was perfect owing to the many small islands that protected it from wind and waves. He ask Jang for land on the seacoast, and she donated the area that the prince needed.

In Thai, satta means 'seven', while hip means 'box' or 'barrier'. Thus Sattahip means the 'seven barriers', which are the islands that protect the coast of the district. These islands are Ko Phra, Ko Yo, Ko Mu, Ko Tao Mo, Ko Nen, Ko San Chalam and Ko Bo.

The minor district (king amphoe) Sattahip was created on 1 April 1937 by separating the sub-districts Sattahip and Na Chom Thien from Bang Lamung district. It was upgraded to a full district in 1953.

Climate

Administration
The district is divided into five sub-districts (tambons), which are further subdivided into 41 villages (mubans). There are three sub-district municipalities (thesaban tambons): Sattahip, Na Chom Thian, and Bang Sare. Sattahip covers parts of tambons Sattahip and Phlu Ta Luang. Na Chom Thian and Bang Sare each parts of the same-named tambon. There are a further five tambon administrative organizations (TAO).

References

External links

amphoe.com 

 
Districts of Chonburi province